Göta Life Guards may refer to:

, see List of Swedish infantry regiments (1742–1939)
Göta Life Guards (armoured), Swedish Army armoured regiment (1943–1980)